In set theory, an uncountable cardinal is inaccessible if it cannot be obtained from smaller cardinals by the usual operations of cardinal arithmetic.

The term "inaccessible cardinal" is ambiguous. Until about 1950, it meant "weakly inaccessible cardinal", but since then it usually means "strongly inaccessible cardinal". An uncountable cardinal is weakly inaccessible if it is a regular weak limit cardinal. It is strongly inaccessible, or just inaccessible, if it is a regular strong limit cardinal (this is equivalent to the definition given above). Some authors do not require weakly and strongly inaccessible cardinals to be uncountable (in which case  is strongly inaccessible).

Every strongly inaccessible cardinal is also weakly inaccessible, as every strong limit cardinal is also a weak limit cardinal. If the generalized continuum hypothesis holds, then a cardinal is strongly inaccessible if and only if it is weakly inaccessible.

 (aleph-null) is a regular strong limit cardinal. Assuming the axiom of choice, every other infinite cardinal number is regular or a (weak) limit. However, only a rather large cardinal number can be both and thus weakly inaccessible.

An ordinal is a weakly inaccessible cardinal if and only if it is a regular ordinal and it is a limit of regular ordinals. A cardinal which is weakly inaccessible and also a strong limit cardinal is strongly inaccessible.

The assumption of the existence of a strongly inaccessible cardinal is sometimes applied in the form of the assumption that one can work inside a Grothendieck universe, the two ideas being intimately connected.

Models and consistency 
Zermelo–Fraenkel set theory with Choice (ZFC) implies that the th level of the Von Neumann universe  is a model of ZFC whenever  is strongly inaccessible. And ZF implies that the Gödel universe  is a model of ZFC whenever  is weakly inaccessible. Thus, ZF together with "there exists a weakly inaccessible cardinal" implies that ZFC is consistent. Therefore, inaccessible cardinals are a type of large cardinal.

Here  is the set of Δ0 definable subsets of X (see constructible universe).

Suppose  is a model of ZFC. Thus, the consistency of ZFC implies consistency of ZFC+"there are no strong inaccessibles". So consistency of ZFC implies consistency of ZFC+"there are no weak inaccessibles". This shows that ZFC cannot prove the existence of an inaccessible cardinal, so ZFC is consistent with the non-existence of any inaccessible cardinals.

The issue whether ZFC is consistent with the existence of an inaccessible cardinal is more subtle. The proof sketched in the previous paragraph that the consistency of ZFC implies the consistency of ZFC + "there is not an inaccessible cardinal" can be formalized in ZFC. However, assuming that ZFC is consistent, no proof that the consistency of ZFC implies the consistency of ZFC + "there is an inaccessible cardinal" can be formalized in ZFC. This follows from Gödel's second incompleteness theorem, which shows that if ZFC + "there is an inaccessible cardinal" is consistent, then it cannot prove its own consistency. Because ZFC + "there is an inaccessible cardinal" does prove the consistency of ZFC, if ZFC proved that its own consistency implies the consistency of ZFC + "there is an inaccessible cardinal" then this latter theory would be able to prove its own consistency, which is impossible if it is consistent.

There are arguments for the existence of inaccessible cardinals that cannot be formalized in ZFC.

Existence of a proper class of inaccessibles
There are many important axioms in set theory which assert the existence of a proper class of cardinals which satisfy a predicate of interest. In the case of inaccessibility, the corresponding axiom is the assertion that for every cardinal μ, there is an inaccessible cardinal  which is strictly larger, . Thus, this axiom guarantees the existence of an infinite tower of inaccessible cardinals (and may occasionally be referred to as the inaccessible cardinal axiom). As is the case for the existence of any inaccessible cardinal, the inaccessible cardinal axiom is unprovable from the axioms of ZFC. Assuming ZFC, the inaccessible cardinal axiom is equivalent to the universe axiom of Grothendieck and Verdier: every set is contained in a Grothendieck universe. The axioms of ZFC along with the universe axiom (or equivalently the inaccessible cardinal axiom) are denoted ZFCU (not to be confused with ZFC with urelements). This axiomatic system is useful to prove for example that every category has an appropriate Yoneda embedding.

This is a relatively weak large cardinal axiom since it amounts to saying that ∞ is 1-inaccessible in the language of the next section, where ∞ denotes the least ordinal not in V, i.e. the class of all ordinals in your model.

α-inaccessible cardinals and hyper-inaccessible cardinals 
The term "α-inaccessible cardinal" is ambiguous and different authors use inequivalent definitions. One definition is that
In this case the 0-inaccessible cardinals are the same as strongly inaccessible cardinals. In this case the 0-weakly inaccessible cardinals are the regular cardinals and the 1-weakly inaccessible cardinals are the weakly inaccessible cardinals.

The α-inaccessible cardinals can also be described as fixed points of functions which count the lower inaccessibles. For example, denote by ψ0(λ) the λth inaccessible cardinal, then the fixed points of ψ0 are the 1-inaccessible cardinals. Then letting ψβ(λ) be the λth β-inaccessible cardinal, the fixed points of ψβ are the (β+1)-inaccessible cardinals (the values ψβ+1(λ)). If α is a limit ordinal, an α-inaccessible is a fixed point of every ψβ for β < α (the value ψα(λ) is the λth such cardinal).   This process of taking fixed points of functions generating successively larger cardinals is commonly encountered in the study of large cardinal numbers.

The term hyper-inaccessible is ambiguous and has at least three incompatible meanings. Many authors use it to mean a regular limit of strongly inaccessible cardinals (1-inaccessible). Other authors use it to mean that  is -inaccessible. (It can never be -inaccessible.) It is occasionally used to mean Mahlo cardinal.

The term α-hyper-inaccessible is also ambiguous. Some authors use it to mean α-inaccessible. Other authors use the definition that

Hyper-hyper-inaccessible cardinals and so on can be defined in similar ways, and as usual this term is ambiguous.

Using "weakly inaccessible" instead of "inaccessible", similar definitions can be made for "weakly α-inaccessible", "weakly hyper-inaccessible", and "weakly α-hyper-inaccessible".

Mahlo cardinals are inaccessible, hyper-inaccessible, hyper-hyper-inaccessible, ... and so on.

Two model-theoretic characterisations of inaccessibility 
Equivalently,  is -indescribable for all n ≥ 0.

It is provable in ZF that ∞ satisfies a somewhat weaker reflection property, where the substructure  is only required to be 'elementary' with respect to a finite set of formulas. Ultimately, the reason for this weakening is that whereas the model-theoretic satisfaction relation  can be defined, semantic truth itself (i.e. ) cannot, due to Tarski's theorem.

Secondly, under ZFC it can be shown that  is inaccessible if and only if  is a model of second order ZFC.

In this case, by the reflection property above, there exists  such that  is a standard model of (first order) ZFC. Hence, the existence of an inaccessible cardinal is a stronger hypothesis than the existence of a transitive model of ZFC.

See also
 Worldly cardinal, a weaker notion
 Mahlo cardinal, a stronger notion
 Club set
 Inner model
 Von Neumann universe
 Constructible universe

Works cited 

. English translation: .

Large cardinals